Jitsuko (written: 実子) is a feminine Japanese given name. Notable people with the name include:

 (born 1946), Japanese speed skater
 (born 1943), Japanese actress

Japanese feminine given names